James Wang may refer to:
James C. Wang (born 1936), Taiwan-born biologist
James Z. Wang (born 1972), American computer scientist
James Wang (actor), Chinese actor and casting agent
James Wang, founder of the animation studio Wang Film Productions

See also
Jimmy Wang (disambiguation)
James Wong (disambiguation)